The Pyramus and Thisbe Club was founded in 1974 to bring together surveyors and architects with a professional interest in party wall matters, especially related to the  Party Wall etc. Act 1996.

The club is named after the Shakespearean characters Pyramus and Thisbe, the two lovers who were separated by a wall in A Midsummer Night's Dream. 

The Club has published a book called The Party Wall Act Explained (ISBN 9780955845406) which is often referred to as The Green Book, and was referred to in the House of Lords during the debate leading up to the Party Wall etc Act in January 1996.

References

External links
 
 Gyle-Thompson and Others v Wall Street. (Properties) Ltd

Professional associations based in the United Kingdom
Organizations established in 1974
Architecture-related professional associations
1974 establishments in the United Kingdom